Poraż  (Porazh) is a village in the administrative district of Gmina Zagórz, within Sanok County, Subcarpathian Voivodeship, in south-eastern Poland.

The village has a population of 1,400.

18 February 1846 - beginning of the Galician peasant revolt.

See also
 Walddeutsche

References

Villages in Sanok County